Hadingus was one of the earliest legendary Danish kings according to Saxo Grammaticus' Gesta Danorum, where he has a detailed biography. Georges Dumézil and others have argued that Hadingus was partially modelled on the god Njörðr.

Gesta Danorum
Hadingus is the legendary son of Gram of Denmark and Signe, the daughter of Finnish King Sumble. Gram steals Signe from her wedding, kills the husband (Henry, King of Saxony) and takes her to Denmark, where Hadingus is born. When Gram is killed by Swipdag, King of Norway, Hadingus is taken to Sweden and is fostered by the giant Wagnofthus and his daughter Harthgrepa. He is eager to become a warrior but Harthgrepa tries to dissuade him from it in favor of entering into a quasi-incestuous love-relationship with her.

Why doth thy life thus waste and wander? Why dost thou pass thy years unwed, following arms, thirsting for throats? Nor does my beauty draw thy vows. Carried away by excess of frenzy, thou art little prone to love. Steeped in blood and slaughter, thou judgest wars better than the bed, nor refreshest thy soul with incitements. Thy fierceness finds no leisure; dalliance is far from thee, and savagery fostered. Nor is thy hand free from blasphemy while thou loathest the rites of love. Let this hateful strictness pass away, let that loving warmth approach, and plight the troth of love to me, who gave thee the first breasts of milk in childhood, and helped thee, playing a mother's part, duteous to thy needs. The Danish History, Book One 

Hadingus accepts Harthgrepa's embraces and when he wants to travel back to Denmark she accompanies him. After raising a man from the dead to obtain information, Harthgrepa is killed by supernatural beings. At this point Hadingus acquires a new patron, Odin, who predicts his future and gives him advice.

Hadingus wages wars in the Baltic and achieves victory and renown. He then returns to Scandinavia, defeats Suibdagerus, his father's slayer, and becomes king of Denmark. As king he has an eventful career ahead of him. He wars with Norwegians and Swedes, offends a god by killing a divine animal and atones for it by a sacrifice to Freyr, he rescues the princess Regnilda from giants and takes her as a wife, visits the underworld, participates in more wars and dies by hanging himself in front of his subjects.

The story of Hadding is retold in fictionalized form by Poul Anderson in the novel War of the Gods.

See also 
 Haddingjar

Notes

References
 Dumézil, Georges (1973). From Myth to Fiction : The Saga of Hadingus. Trans. Derek Coltman. Chicago: U. of Chicago Press. .
 Davidson, Hilda Ellis (ed.) and Peter Fisher (tr.) (1999). Saxo Grammaticus : The History of the Danes : Books I-IX. Bury St Edmunds: St Edmundsbury Press. . First published 1979-1980.
 Elton, Oliver (tr.) (1905). The Nine Books of the Danish History of Saxo Grammaticus. New York: Norroena Society. Available online
 Olrik, J. and H. Ræder (1931). Saxo Grammaticus : Gesta Danorum. Available online

Mythological kings of Denmark